The Union of Myanmar Federation of National Politics (abbreviated UMFNP) is a political party in Burma (Myanmar), whose leaders are closely allied to the former ruling military junta, the State Peace and Development Council. UMFNP contested seats in the 2010 Burmese general election but won none.

It is currently contesting 2 Pyithu Hluttaw seats in the 2012 Burmese by-elections.

References

Political parties in Myanmar
Political parties established in 2005
2005 establishments in Myanmar